Nuttall's woodpecker (Dryobates nuttallii) is a species of woodpecker named after naturalist Thomas Nuttall in 1843. They are found in oak woodlands of California and are similar to the ladder-backed woodpecker in both genetics and appearance.

Description

Nuttall's woodpecker has black wings and tail feathers with white barring. On the ventral surface, colour is white with black spots and barring. It has a black forehead with white streaks on the sides and an unbarred black region at the top of the back. Adult males have a distinguishable red crown which females do not. However, this physical feature is present in the juvenile of both sexes. They have zygodactyl feet and stiff tail feathers which allows them to maintain a vertical position on trees; typical of woodpeckers.

Taxonomy
The Nuttall's woodpecker is closely related to the ladder-backed woodpecker of Arizona, New Mexico, Texas, and Mexico. The Nuttall's likely evolved via allopatric speciation when the two species were separated into smaller ranges by dry climate during the Pleistocene glaciation. Hybrids of the two species exist but are rare.

Habitat and distribution
Nuttall's are a non-migratory species with a geographic range confined to northern California extending south towards the northwest region of Baja California, Mexico. Their preferred habitat is arid to mesic woodlands. In particular, these woodpeckers prefer oak woodlands, although they also occur in riparian sites and chaparral in the most southern parts of its range because of the decrease in oak abundance. Although they have been found as far east as Central Wyoming.

The birds are not considered globally threatened although the range is restricted to the California Endemic Bird Area. They are fairly common in California with a total world population estimated at over 100,000 individuals (density of about 20 birds per square kilometer in San Bernardino County). Surveys suggest no obvious population trends.

Behaviour

Vocalizations
Vocalizations performed by Nuttall's woodpecker are considered to be not of any harmonic. Some vocalizations have been described:

 Call note: used between mated pairs to communicate their location to each other.
 Double call: same function as call note can but also be used as a low threat alarm call.
 Rattle call: used to establish territories when feeding
 Kweek call: used between sexes mainly by female prior to copulation.

Both sexes drum. Rolls are relatively long, averaging over one second.

Diet
Nuttall's woodpecker feeds primarily on insect larvae such as those of wood borers, click beetles, and ants, found by tapping and probing into the crevices in oak trees. The bird also feeds on sap from sap holes created by red-breasted sapsuckers in birch and willow, and consumes a variety of berry seeds.

Reproduction

Pair bonding occurs in late January to March with egg-laying mostly in April and May. Nuttall's woodpeckers are socially monogamous and show displays of bi-parental care. New nests are excavated each year by males in the cavities of dead trees such as willow, oak, and alder. Clutch sizes range from three to six eggs with the male partner incubating the eggs at night and the female during the day. Incubation period can be up to 14 days. Fledglings are able to leave the nest around 29 days post hatch with parental care continuing for 14 days after that.

References

External links

 Nuttall's woodpecker, a bibliographic resource
 
 

Nuttall's woodpecker
Nuttall's woodpecker
Fauna of the California chaparral and woodlands
Nuttall's woodpecker